The 1958 Chattanooga Moccasins football team was an American football team that represented the University of Chattanooga (now known as the University of Tennessee at Chattanooga) during the 1958 NCAA College Division football season. In their 28th year under head coach Scrappy Moore, the team compiled a 5–5 record. Notably, Moore's 1958 outfit defeated the Tennessee Volunteers at Neyland Stadium. This was the first victory for UTC over the Vols since 1905, and only their second victory in the series overall.

Schedule

References

Chattanooga
Chattanooga Mocs football seasons
Chattanooga Moccasins football